Shergarh is a village in Shahkot in Jalandhar district of Punjab State, India. The village is administrated by a sarpanch who is an elected representative of the village as per Panchayati raj (India).

Demography 
As of 2011, Qadian has a total number of 45 houses and population of 204, of which 108 are males while 96 are females, according to the report published by Census India in 2011. The literacy rate of the village is 78.07%, higher than the state average of 75.84%. The population of children under the age of 6 years is 17, which is 8.33% of total population of the village, and child sex ratio is approximately 889 lower than the state average of 846.

The town does not have any schedule or schedule Tribe population so far.

As per the 2011 census, 63 people were engaged in work activities out of the total population of the village which included 57 males and 6 females. According to the census, 93.65% workers describe their work as main work and 6.35% workers are involved in marginal activity providing livelihood for less than 6 months.

Transport 
Shahkot Malisian station is the nearest train station.

See also
List of villages in India

References 

Villages in Jalandhar district